Anthimus, also spelled Anthimos, Anthinos or Anthinus, is a Greek name for males.  In Italian and Spanish, the name is rendered as Antimo.  

The name may refer to:

Anthimus of Nicomedia, bishop and martyr who died during a persecution in the early 4th century
Anthimus of Rome (died 303), saint, priest and martyr who died during the persecutions of Diocletian
Anthimus of Tyana, bishop in AD 372; at times an opponent of Basil of Caesarea
Anthimus (physician), Greek doctor at the court of Theodoric the Great and author of De observatione ciborum ("On the Observance of Foods")
Anthimos Gazis (1758–1828), a hero of the Greek War of Independence
Anthimus of Naples, Anthimus or Anthemus, the Duke of Naples from 801 until around 818

Anthimus is the name of seven Patriarchs of Constantinople:

Patriarch Anthimus I of Constantinople, a Miaphysite patriarch of Constantinople in 535–536
Patriarch Anthimus II of Constantinople (died 1628), reigned a few months in 1623
Patriarch Anthimus III of Constantinople, reigned between 1822 and 1824
Patriarch Anthimus IV of Constantinople (died 1878), reigned between 1840 and 1841, and between 1848 and 1852
Patriarch Anthimus V of Constantinople, reigned between 1841 and 1842
Patriarch Anthimus VI of Constantinople (1790–1878), reigned three times: 1845–1848, 1853–1855, and 1871–1873
Patriarch Anthimus VII of Constantinople (1835–1913), reigned between 1895 and 1896

Spelled Anthinus this name may refer to:

 Anthinus, a genus of air-breathing land snails

See also
Anthemius (disambiguation)